Once Upon a Hell of a Time is the sixth studio album by Matt Mays, released on October 20, 2017. His first studio album since 2012, the album was inspired in part by the death of his bandmate Jay Smith in 2013 during the tour to support Coyote.

The album's cover art was designed by artist Ola Volo, who is herself the subject of a song on the album.

In 2018, Mays released Twice Upon a Hell of a Time, an album comprising acoustic renditions of the same songs.

Track listing

All songs written by Matt Mays, except as noted.

References

External links
 Official Matt Mays Website

2017 albums
Matt Mays albums